Memo Rex Commander y el Corazón Atómico de la Vía Láctea (Memo Rex Commander and the Atomic Heart of the Milky Way) is the third studio album by Mexican rock band Zoé. The record shows a noticeable synthpop influence.

It debuted at #1 in Mexican store sales, which was a first-time achievement for the band. The album was a success and received Gold certification for more than 60,000 units sold within four weeks of its release, and received favorable reviews by professional press.

The first single off the album was "Vía Láctea", which charted well on Latin music video channels. The second single "No Me Destruyas" was released in November 2006, while "Paula" was released in July 2007. This album was eventually certified platinum for over 80,000 copies sold in Mexico alone.

"Vía Láctea" and "No Me Destruyas" continue to be extremely popular with the band's fans, and are still among the most frequently played songs at Zoé shows, including the 2018 US tour.

Track listing

The special edition includes an extra track, "Everything Goes", and a second DVD containing the video for "No me Destruyas" and three live videos (Corazón Atómico, Vinyl and Human Space Volt) and also includes a video recording of "Paula".

Sales and certifications

References

2006 albums
Zoé albums